Yahoo! Movies (formerly Upcoming Movies), provided by the Yahoo! network, is home to a large collection of information on movies, past and new releases, trailers and clips, box office information, and showtimes and movie theater information. Yahoo! Movies also includes red carpet photos, actor galleries, and production stills. Users can read critic's reviews, write and read other user reviews, get personalized movie recommendations, purchase movie tickets online, and create and view other user's lists of their favorite movies.

Special coverage

Yahoo! Movies devotes special coverage to the Academy Awards with a special Oscars site. The Oscars site includes articles, show coverage, a list of the night's big winners, photos, videos, and polls.

From 2002 to 2007, Yahoo! Movies was the home of Greg's Previews of Upcoming Movies, an enhanced version of Upcomingmovies.com, written by its creator, Greg Dean Schmitz.

Yahoo! Movies also releases special guides, such as the Summer Movie Guide, which contains information on the major releases of the summer with exclusive trailers and clips, photos, box office information, polls, and unique editorial content.

Additionally, Yahoo! Movies teamed up with MTV to host a special site for the MTV Movie Awards, which will feature show information and a section where users can submit original movie shorts parodying last year's movies for the chance to win the new award, Best Movie Spoof.

Key dates
May 12, 1998 - Yahoo! announces the launch of Yahoo! Movies.
May 25, 2005 - Yahoo! Movies releases personalized movie recommendations.

Closure

On July 4, 2022 Yahoo! announces that Yahoo! Movies is shut down.

References

External links
Official website

Movies
American film websites
Internet properties established in 1998